The Libertad coins are  silver and gold bullion coins originating from Mexico and minted by the  La Casa de Moneda de México (Mexican Mint). The Mexican Mint was established in 1535 and is the oldest mint in the Americas. The modern coins contain 99.9% silver or gold (.999 fineness) and are available in various sizes.  Both metal coins have undergone a design change. In 1989, 3,500  ounce Libertad platinum coins were produced.  Libertads are devoid of face value,  yet are still accepted as currency and guaranteed by Banco de México based on the market value of its gold or silver content.

In addition to the bullion version, a proof and reverse proof versions for both metals are manufactured specifically for collectors.  Proof coins contain a frosted angel with a polished background. A reverse proof is the opposite and has a polished angel with a frosted background.  An antique finish is available in silver and is also sought out by collectors. An antique finish gives coins an aged appearance without any loss of detail. The antiqued finish usually displays portions that look as if they have toned darker. Proof and antique finish coins are minted in relatively small quantities and are considered more beautiful and valuable than the standard bullion coin.

Design

Obverse: The Coat of arms of Mexico is shown with a Mexican golden eagle perched on a prickly pear cactus devouring a rattlesnake. This imagery relates to the founding of Tenochtitlan, present-day Mexico City. The coat of arms is rooted in the legend where the god Huitzilopochtli told the Aztec people where to build their city where they saw an eagle eating a snake on top of a cactus.  The bottom half of the coat of arms has oak and laurel leaves encircling the eagle.  The top half has the words  (United Mexican States) encircling the eagle.  The gold obverse has not changed since its inception and the silver coin had the same obverse at its inception.  In 2000, the silver obverse was changed to depict the current Mexican national coat of arms along with 10 past versions of this symbol surrounding it. The Spanish inscription ESTADOS UNIDOS MEXICANOS still surrounds the central coat of arms. The past version of the symbol at the top is found in the Codex Mendoza from 1524.

Reverse: The design used was based on the 1921 gold Centenario, a coin issued to mark the centennial of Mexican independence. The winged Victoria of Angel of Independence is in front with the volcanoes Popocatépetl and Iztaccihuatl in the background. The weight ( or ounce), date, and purity are also listed. The older Libertad coins show a front-facing view of the angel. The new Libertad series shows a three-quarter side profile of the angel.  The gold used the older angel from 1981 through 1999.  The silver used the older angel from 1982 through 1995.

Specifications

Gold coins have not changed sizes since first minted.  From 1982 through 1995, the one, and  ounce silver coins had slightly smaller diameters and greater thicknesses than current minted coins.  From 1981 through 1990, the gold coins contained 90% gold (.90 fineness).  The gold coins since 1991 and all silver coins have contained 99.9% silver or gold. (.999 fineness).

Silver mintage

Silver proof mintage (p) Proof; (rp) Reverse proof;  (af) Antique finish

Gold mintage

Gold proof mintage  (p) Proof; (rp) Reverse proof

See also
 Bullion
 Bullion coin
 Gold as an investment
 Inflation hedge
 Silver as an investment

References

Banxico, banco central, Banco de México
 
 La Casa de Moneda de México

Bullion coins of Mexico
Gold bullion coins
Silver bullion coins